Mayfield is a village on the outskirts of Ashbourne in Derbyshire, about 9 miles from Uttoxeter, situated in East Staffordshire.

The village is divided into Mayfield, Church Mayfield, Lower Mayfield, Upper Mayfield and Middle Mayfield. It has a population of approximately 2000. It lies on the banks of the River Dove. The Dove is the boundary between Derbyshire and Staffordshire. Mayfield is on the Staffordshire side of the border but it has an Ashbourne postal address because its nearest postal town, Ashbourne, is in Derbyshire. Derbyshire is not used by Royal Mail.

History
Mayfield was mentioned in the Domesday Book, in which it was called 'Mavreveldt'. The name is possibly derived from the Old English for 'open land growing with madder' or perhaps, 'assembly open land'.

It was the scene of a siege during the retreat of Bonnie Prince Charlie, whose followers terrorised the local villagers forcing them to take refuge in John the Baptist's church. Several musket ball holes, reputedly from weapons fired during the siege, can still be seen in one of the doors of the church.

There has been a church in Mayfield for over a thousand years. The Domesday Survey of 1086 recorded a priest in Mayfield, one of only twenty-five priests recorded for the county of Staffordshire. There is now no trace of the original Church, which would have been a Saxon wooden building standing on or near to the site of the present church. The Saxon church was replaced during the reign of Henry I by a Norman stone building in about 1125. The church was extended in the 15 and 16th Centuries, with the tower being built in 1515. The final extension was in 1854. 

On the 13 June 1944 an Royal Air Force Vickers Wellington (LP397) from RAF Castle Donington was on a cross country exercise. 25 minutes later the aircraft entered a thuderstorm shrotly after the aircraft went into a nose dive & crashed near the village. All Six of the bomber crew died in the crash.

Economy
Mayfield's mill, in one form or another, has been standing on the banks of the Dove since the 12th Century. Today Mayfield Yarns produces warped and twisted yarns. The parish is also home to several farms.

School
Henry Prince First School in Mayfield shut down in summer 2019.

Local customs
Every summer Mayfield continues the well dressing tradition where wells and springs are decorated with tableaux created by pressing flower petals into clay. The first Well Dressing festival in Mayfield was held in 1896.

The preparation of the boards takes several days. Clay is spread over the wet boards then the outline of the design pricked out with coffee beans. "Petalling" follows and finally the boards are erected by the wells. The wells are blessed by local clergy (Church of England, Catholic and Methodist) and remain for a week for people to view.

Local groups 
There is a thriving scout group that opened in 2015. The group takes children from the Village and surrounding areas and is run by volunteers. The group scout leader is Katy Lewis.

Mayfield Panthers is the football club and caters for all ages through both Summer and Winter Leagues.

Mayfield Heritage Group aims to promote and protect heritage and history in and around Mayfield.

The Mayfield Memorial Hall is a charity providing a venue and fundraising events for the village.

Mayfield Recreational Association (the MRA) provide outdoor and sporting facilities for children, young people and adults in and around Mayfield. They offer a football field, multi-use games area, bowling green, playground and pavilion.

MARNA is a community group formed in 2019 to improve facilities in Mayfield and put on events for children and older people. 

Senior Social is a club for the over-sixties in the village.

Notable residents 
 William Barton (1598?–1678) an English hymnologist and vicar of Mayfield   
 Thomas Moore (1779-1852) Irish writer, poet and lyricist. His daughter, Olivia Byron Moore, is buried in the Mayfield churchyard 
 Sir Bertram Windle FRS, FSA, (1858 in  Mayfield Vicarage – 1929) a British anatomist, administrator, archaeologist, scientist, educationalist, writer and vitalist

See also
Listed buildings in Mayfield, Staffordshire

References 

Towns and villages of the Peak District
Staffordshire Moorlands
Aviation accidents and incidents locations in England